Melrose station (also known as Melrose–East 162nd Street station) is a commuter rail stop on the Metro-North Railroad's Harlem Line, serving the Melrose neighborhood of the Bronx, New York City. It is located in an open cut beneath Park Avenue at its intersection with East 162nd Street. Service at Melrose is limited; trains stop approximately every half-hour during rush hours and every hour all other times.

History

Original station 
A station along the New York and Harlem Railroad in Melrose was known to exist as far back as 1841. When Melrose station was rebuilt by the New York Central Railroad (NYC) in the late 19th century, it contained a station house as a bridge over all four tracks, with two island platforms. Similar structures were built for the former Morrisania Station, as well as Tremont Station.

Planned closure 
As with other NYC stations in the Bronx, the station became a Penn Central station once the NYC and Pennsylvania Railroads merged in 1968. However, because of the railroad's serious financial distress following the merger, commuter service was turned over to the Metropolitan Transportation Authority in 1972. Penn Central was acquired by Conrail in 1976, and the line and station were completely turned over to Metro-North Railroad on January 1, 1983.

In 1988, the station was nearly closed due to the station's low daily ridership of 20 riders in the morning and 20 in the evening, and the adjacent Tremont station would have been closed on weekends. On February 26, 1988, the MTA board approved plans to close the station. A spokesman for Metro-North said that the station was being "land banked" and was being boarded up, allowing it to be reopened if ridership increased. The decision was strongly opposed by Bronx Borough President Fernando Ferrer, who said that the agency created a self-fulfilling prophecy by failing to promote the station and by not maintaining it. Service at the station was very infrequent, and as a result local residents did not consider using it. He also cited the $80 million plan to redevelop the area.

On March 30, 1988, two days before the planned closure of the station on April 1, Ferrer held a press conference with other Bronx political leaders outside the station protesting the MTA's decision. Ferrer led a tour of the station, showing its use by drug addicts, and its state of disrepair. He said that Metro-North should be working to improve the station and better market the service instead of closing it. At the time, workers were sinking cement posts to board up the station in preparation for its closing. Metro-North planned to close the station on April 1, 1988, but delayed it by ninety days at the request of Bronx officials to allow the railroad and the community to study future development plans in the area and to reconsider the future of the station. The annual maintenance cost for the station was $27,000, or more than $1,300 per rider. Melrose was removed from the April 3, 1988 timetable in anticipation of its closing but was reinstated on the June 19, 1988 timetable as the station never did close.

In July 1988, Ferrer outlined several strategies to market the station and increase ridership. These included printing flyers publicizing the station and its scheduled stops to the Melrose community, including court facilities on 161st Street, the Concourse Village complex, and the Bronx Court Building, offering commuter discounts and free round-trips on a temporary basis, posting directional signs to the station's entrance, and installing mirrors to increase safety in the station. On August 16, 1989, Metro-North announced that it had dropped plans to close the station. The station had been kept open, cleaned up, and the issue was reviewed at the request of Ferrer.

On July 9, 2000 service at the station and Tremont was doubled, increasing from 11 weekday trains to 25 trains, and weekend service was restored, adding 19 daily trips. $2 million was provided in the MTA's 2000–2004 Capital Program to pay for new staircases at the station. Most of that funding went to Melrose as the station was hard to find because it was located partially underneath a high-rise building. In 2006, the station was renovated, and the northbound platform was moved out from underneath the overpass to its current location.

Prior to the opening of the Yankees–East 153rd Street station on the Hudson Line in 2009, the station was the closest station on the New York Central (later Penn Central) to Yankee Stadium. Specials ran to and from the station to serve events at the stadium.

In 2012, Melrose residents expressed concern regarding the station; residents would like to see more frequent service, but track and capacity limitations hinder the amount of service available for the stop. Other concerns regarded the lack of handicap access, and the past closure of the main entrance to the stop. The main entrance was closed when the community was at the height of its turmoil, but as the community has regained its footing the desire to have the station open to the primary commercial street, 161st Street, has grown.

Station layout
The station has two offset high-level side platforms each two cars long reached by stairway from East 162nd Street and Courtland Avenue. When trains stop at the station, normally the front two open cars receive and discharge passengers. The southbound platform is located underneath East 162nd Street and the New York City Housing Authority's Morrisania Air Rights public housing project. The station is located just south of a former wye with the northern terminus of the former Port Morris Branch.

References

External links

 List of upcoming train departure times and track assignments from MTA
 162nd Street entrance from Google Maps Street View
 Melrose Station, N.Y.C.R.R.; image at Museum of the City of New York
 Grand Central-Bound Platform from Google Maps Street View
 Northbound Platform from Google Maps Street View

Metro-North Railroad stations in New York City
Former New York Central Railroad stations
Railway stations in the Bronx
M
Melrose, Bronx